This article covers the period from 1877 to present. Before the beginning of the Open Era in April 1968, only amateurs were allowed to compete in established tennis tournaments, including the four Grand Slam tournaments (also known as the majors). Wimbledon, the oldest of the majors, was founded in 1877, followed by the US Open in 1881, the French Open in 1891 and the Australian Open in 1905. Beginning in 1905 and continuing to the present day, all four majors have been played yearly, with the exception of during the two World Wars, 1986 for the Australian Open, and 2020 for Wimbledon. The Australian Open is the first major of the year (January), followed by the French Open (May–June), Wimbledon (June–July) and the US Open (August–September). There was no prize money and players were compensated for travel expenses only. A player who wins all four majors, in singles or as part of a doubles team, in the same calendar year is said to have achieved a "Grand Slam". If the player wins all four consecutively, but not in the same calendar year, it is called a "Non-Calendar Year Grand Slam". Winning all four at some point in a career, even if not consecutively, is referred to as a "Career Grand Slam". Winning the four majors and a gold medal in tennis at the Summer Olympics in the same calendar year has been called a "Golden Slam" since 1988. Winning all four majors plus an Olympic gold at some point in a career, even if not consecutively, is referred to as a "Career Golden Slam". Winning the year-end championship while also having won a Golden Slam is referred to as a "Super Slam". Winning all four majors, an Olympic gold, and the year-end championships at some point in a career, even if not consecutively, is referred to as a "Career Super Slam". Winning the four majors in all three disciplines a player is eligible for–singles, doubles and mixed doubles–is considered winning a "boxed set" of Grand Slam titles.

Prior to 1924, the major tennis championships, governed by the International Lawn Tennis Federation (ILTF), were the World Hard Court Championships, World Grass Court Championships (Wimbledon), and World Covered Court Championships.

Many top tennis players turned professional before the Open Era to play legally for prize money. They played in separate professional events and were banned from competing any of the four Grand Slam tournaments. They mostly competed on pro tours involving head-to-head competition, but also in professional tournaments as the biggest events on the pro tour. In addition to the head-to-head tours, there were the annual professional tournaments called "Championship tournaments" (known retrospectively as "professional majors" or "professional Grand Slams" where the world's top professional players usually played. These tournaments held a certain tradition and longevity.

The oldest of these three professional majors, was the U.S. Pro Tennis Championships, played at a variety of different venues and on a variety of different surfaces, between 1925 and 1999, although it was no longer a major after 1967. Between 1954 and 1962, the U.S. Pro was played indoors in Cleveland and was billed as the World Professional Championships. The most prestigious of the three was generally the Wembley Championship. Played between 1934 and 1990, at the Wembley Arena in England, it was unofficially usually considered the world's championship until 1967. The third professional major was the French Pro Championship, played between 1934 and 1968, on the clay courts of Roland Garros, apart from 1963 to 1967, when it was played on the indoor wood courts of Stade Coubertin.

The Open Era of tennis began in 1968, when the Grand Slam tournaments agreed to allow professional players to compete with amateurs. A professional tennis tour was created for the entire year, where everyone could compete. This meant that the division that had existed for many years between these two groups had finally come to an end, which made the tennis world into one unified competition.
The first tournament to go "Open" started on 22 April 1968 was the British Hard Court Championships at The West Hants Club in Bournemouth, England. The first Grand Slam tournament to do so was the 1968 French Open, starting on 27 May.

Analysis of records

Today, the ultimate pursuit in tennis is to win the Grand Slam; winning all four Grand Slam tournaments in the same calendar year. In 1982, the International Tennis Federation (ITF) broadened the definition of the Grand Slam as meaning any four straight major victories, including the ones spanning two calendar years that became known as the non-calendar year Grand Slam, though it later reversed its definition.

In the history of men's tennis, only two players have won the calendar Grand Slam, Don Budge (1938) and Rod Laver (1962 and 1969). Budge remains the sole player to have won six majors in a row (1937–1938). In the Open Era, only one player has achieved the non-calendar year Grand Slam, Novak Djokovic (2015–2016). This is followed by a career Grand Slam, a feat achieved by a player winning each of the majors during their career, which eight players have done. Winning just one of these major tournaments in a year is a sought-after achievement but winning all four or more consecutively, if we apply Prochnow's (2018) analysis retrospectively in Budge's case, transforms a player into a legend.

When we reflect on the modern era of the sport, tennis has clear separations during its history, such as the first official majors sanctioned by the world governing body of tennis its separate tours (amateur and professional), the eligibility to compete at Grand Slam majors or the surface aspects of the tournaments. In 1913, the ILTF created its first tennis majors, three world championship tournaments that were abolished by 1923. In the history of those early majors, only one player won all three in the same year, Anthony Wilding, arguably the first world champion. In 1927, the men's game was separated, leading to the creation of what are now referred to as the pro majors. During a period of 40 years, only two players achieved the calendar Pro Grand Slam in the history of the professional tour, Ken Rosewall (1963) and Laver (1967). Prior to 1968, only amateurs could enter the Grand Slam tournaments. This was changed in 1968, after which both professionals and amateurs could compete for the tennis majors.

There are also several other facets to take into consideration in defining great tennis players, such as winning all calendar year majors consecutively on offer at the time (World Champs and Pro Slams) on three different surfaces. Three players achieved this distinction between 1913 and 1967, Wilding, Rosewall and Laver. Only those same three players did so not only by surface, but also different environments (indoors and outdoors). When the professional majors were abolished in 1967, the Grand Slam majors were still only being played on two exclusive surfaces, grass and clay. In 1978, the US Open switched surface to a hardcourt thus re-creating a third unique surface. This is arguably the best date in defining the beginning of the modern era of tennis. In this new modern era, only one player (Djokovic) has won all four majors in a row. Only two players have achieved the new term, a "Surface Slam", winning three consecutive majors on three distinct surfaces, that being Rafael Nadal in 2010 and Novak Djokovic in 2021. To have accomplished any of these feats in a group of tournaments originating over 100 years ago underscores the degree of difficulty involved.

These are some of the important records since the start of the first Grand Slam tournament held at the Wimbledon Championships. All statistics are based on data provided by the ATP Tour website, the ITF and other available sources, even if this isn't a complete list due to the time period involved.

Grand Slam tournaments

Career totals
Active players in boldface.

Matches

Grand Slam achievements

Calendar Year Grand Slam

Non-Calendar Year Grand Slam

Career Grand Slam

Consecutive totals

Grand Slam tournaments consecutive streaks
Active streaks in boldface.

Grand Slam tournaments non-consecutive streaks
Player skipped one or more Grand Slam tournaments during his streak.

Grand Slam matches/finals streaks
Streaks can be across non-consecutive tournaments.

Match win streak per Grand Slam tournament

Per Grand Slam tournament totals

Titles per Grand Slam tournament (3+ titles)

Consecutive titles per Grand Slam tournament

Finals per Grand Slam tournament

Runners-up per Grand Slam tournament

Match wins per Grand Slam tournament

Match winning percentage per Grand Slam tournament

Court type totals

Match wins in Grand Slam tournaments per court type

Winning percentage in Grand Slam tournaments per court type

Season totals

Four majors in one calendar year

Three majors

Other

Consecutive majors

Four consecutive

Three consecutive

Two consecutive
Players who won three or four consecutive titles are not listed here.

(*) In 1947 the French Championships were held after Wimbledon.

Non-consecutive majors

Three non-consecutive

Two non-consecutive
Players who won three or four titles are not listed here.

Single season winning percentage

Consecutive titles 
Note: In a row spanning more than one year

6 consecutive majors

4 consecutive majors

3 consecutive majors

(*) Only from 1925 onwards each year had four Grand Slam tournaments.

Winning a Grand Slam singles tournament without losing a set

Grand Slam season streaks

Pro Slam (majors)
Overall totals for early Professional majors (French Pro, Wembley Pro, US Pro).

Career totals

Pro Slam achievements

Pro Slam tournament totals

Titles per tournament

Finals per tournament

Match record per tournament

Pro Slam tournaments streaks

Overall majors
 Major tournaments consist of the combined total of Grand Slams, Pro Slams and early ILTF majors (WHCC, WCCC & WGCC).

Career totals

Matches

 Note: The draw of Pro majors was significantly smaller than the traditional Grand Slam tournaments; usually they only had 16 or even fewer professional players. Though they were the top 16 ranked players in the world at the time, this meant only four (or even fewer) rounds of play instead of the modern six or seven rounds.

All tournaments

Career titles & finals

Career tournament streaks

Career matches

Career match streaks

Career records per court type

Note: Wood has not been used since 1970 and Carpet has not been used since 2009.

Titles per court type

Consecutive titles per court type

Consecutive finals per court type

Career match wins per court type

Career match winning % per court type

Career match win streaks per court type

Situational stats

Single season records

Career season streaks

Single tournament records

Most titles at a single tournament
The following are tennis players who have won a particular tournament at least six times.
Note: Grand Slam and Pro Slam tournaments in boldface

Most finals at a single tournament
The following are tennis players who have reached the final of single tournament at least eleven times.
 Grand Slam and Pro Slam tournaments in boldface

Most consecutive titles at a single tournament
The following are tennis players who have won a particular tournament at least five times in a row.

(*) Tournament held twice in 1977.
(**) Tournament wasn't held during WWI.

Year-end championships 

(1970–present) See the Open Era records page since they have occurred entirely in that era.

Masters tournaments 

(1970–present) See the Open Era records page since they have occurred entirely in that era.

Big Titles

(1990–present) The Grand Slam tournaments, the Masters events and the ATP Finals are the Big Titles of the annual ATP Tour calendar, in addition to the Olympics.

Rankings

Olympic tournaments

Prize money

See also 

 All-time tennis records – Women's singles
 Open Era tennis records – Men's singles
 ATP Tour records
 Lists of tennis records and statistics

Notes

References 

Tennis records and statistics